Acestodorus (Greek ) was a Greek historical writer who is cited by Plutarch, and whose work contained, as it appears, an account of the Battle of Salamis among other things.  The time at which he lived is unknown.  Stephanus of Byzantium speaks of an Acestodorus of Megalopolis, (= FGrHist 1753) who wrote a work on cities, but whether this is the same as the above-mentioned writer is not clear.

References

 

Ancient Megalopolitans
Ancient Greek historians known only from secondary sources